Metrizoic acid is a pharmaceutical drug that was used as an iodinated contrast medium for X-ray imaging. Its uses included angiography (imaging of blood vessels and heart chambers) and urography (imaging of the urinary tract), but it has been discontinued, at least in the US.

It was used in form of its salts, metrizoates. Due to its high osmolality, metrizoic acid had a risk of inducing allergic reactions higher than that of lower osmolar contrast media.

Chemistry
The iodine content of metrizoate ranged from 370 mg/ml to 440 mg/ml, with osmolarity has high as 2100 mOsm/kg. The viscosity is 3.4 cP at 37 degree Celsius (human body temperature).

Adverse effects
Side effects of metrizoate are: urticaria, headache, nausea, vomiting, dizziness, and hypotension. Other side effects include minor electrocardiographic changes such as tachycardia, bradycardia, and inversion of T waves.

References 

Benzoic acids
Iodoarenes
Radiocontrast agents
Acetanilides